Karl Egon Ebert (1801, Prague – 1882, Smíchov) was a Bohemian German poet, born in Prague.

His poems, dramatic and lyric, are collected in 7 volumes, and enjoy a wide popularity in his country. He composed a poem called "Das erste Veilchen", or "The First Violet", which was set to music by Felix Mendelssohn.

German composer Georgina Schubert (1840-1878) used Ebert’s text for her lieder “Der Muschel gleichen meine Leider.”

References 

1801 births
1882 deaths
19th-century Czech poets
Czech male poets
German Bohemian people
Writers from Prague
19th-century male writers